Spicks and Specks is an Australian music-themed comedic television quiz show in which the host, Adam Hills, asks two teams, of three people each, varying music-themed questions in different games. Team leaders are Myf Warhurst and Alan Brough. Members of each team vary from episode to episode; one per team generally comes from the world of music and the other from comedy. Scores are kept, but the prize for the winners is simply personal satisfaction. Many games are named after, or otherwise reference, well known song titles.

The series originally aired on what was then ABC1 at 8:30pm on Wednesday nights, with the show repeated on Thursdays on what was then ABC2 at 8pm. The previous year's season was repeated every Friday at 2:30pm on ABC1.

After the show's end in 2011, and an unsuccessful 2014 relaunch featuring new hosts, a new series began airing in an hour-long weekly format from 18 April 2021 with the original hosts.

Format

The show's general style, employing a mix of music and comedy, is similar to the British show Never Mind the Buzzcocks and fellow Australian TV show RocKwiz, but the question formats and program style (Satirical vs. Family vs. Pub Quiz) are different.

Although there are no prizes for the winners, on rare occasions Hills decides to award some convenient prop for comedic effect – a "Fools' Gold" sandwich very similar (they used strawberry jam as opposed to grape jam) to that eaten by Elvis, for example.

The show takes both its name and theme music from the Bee Gees' 1966 song, Spicks and Specks. The theme music was performed and produced by The Dissociatives, a duo consisting of Silverchair singer Daniel Johns and dance musician Paul Mac, and replaced all the lyrics bar the title refrain with scat singing. In addition, Mac once appeared on the show as a panellist.

The show is hosted by stand-up comedian Adam Hills who poses questions to two three-person teams each headed by a permanent team captain, actor/comedian/author Alan Brough and radio announcer Myf Warhurst.

Games in the show include: Substitute, in which one member from each team sings three well-known tunes, substituting unrelated words from a text provided by Hills, while the other team members have to name the song; Cover Versions in which one teram's member is chosen to draw pictures (in silence), initially representing an album cover and, in later episodes, song titles, while the other members attempt to name the album/song; Musician or Serial Killer, in which each team member is shown a photograph of a person and is asked to identify whether that person is a musician or a serial killer; and The Final Countdown, always the final game of each program, in which members of both teams compete to be first to attempt to answer general questions on music.

History

Original series (2005–2011)

Guest team members, who varied from week to week, included some regulars: Hamish Blake, Jason Byrne, Frank Woodley, Colin Lane, Ross Noble, James Morrison, Renée Geyer, Ella Hooper, Meshel Laurie, Denise Scott, Antoinette Halloran and Dave O'Neil. With the exception of Dave O'Neil, Blake appeared more often than any other guest panellist, and his comparative lack of musical knowledge was a running gag.

In 2007 during a game called Kid's Music Special, the question "What children's song is contained in the song Down Under?" led to music publisher, Larrikin Music, taking legal action against Men at Work songwriters Colin Hay and Ron Strykert over the main flute riff. After three years of litigation, the lawsuit was settled in favour of Larrikin Music after Down Under was deemed to have used key elements of the Australian children's nursery rhyme Kookaburra.

The show returned for its seventh season on 4 May 2011. On 25 May 2011, the ABC announced the seventh season would be last, with the last program on 23 November 2011.

2014 relaunch (2014)

The ABC announced on 28 November 2012, during its 2013 program launch, that Spicks and Specks would be returning in the new year but without Hills, Warhurst, or Brough. The re-launch of the series was delayed by the broadcaster until 2014, with the first episode airing on 5 February. The new host was comedian Josh Earl with Adam Richard and Ella Hooper as team captains.

The revival was axed after 20 episodes due to low ratings, with the final six recorded episodes airing over the summer non-ratings period.

2021 relaunch (2021-2022)
Following the success of several themed specials, the ABC announced a new 10-episode series, hosted by Adam Hills and the original team leaders. Much like those specials and the 2014 series, it featured new games along with classic games, with Know Your Product, Look What They've Done to My Song, Ma, Substitute, and The Final Countdown all appearing in every episode.

The series was filmed during the COVID-19 pandemic while "stage four lockdown" was occurring, leading to some minor changes to the show's set, which was redesigned to have a curved outline, and solo buzzers instead of a single team buzzer. Physical comedy was frequently used in the rebooted series, which mostly came from Dave O'Neil, who appeared as a guitarist, a banana, a lost luggage collector, an ice cream van owner, a mobile DJ, the sole owner of Kurt Cobain's MTV Unplugged guitar,, a Zoom comedian who has a puppet bat, a bootleg merchandise seller, and a "Dave-A-Roo" deliveryman.

ABC renewed the series for a second season in 2022, this time with a live audience. The second season premiered on 7 August 2022. Following the death of Queen Elizabeth II, the season's sixth episode was pushed back by a week.

Games
In the majority of games, each team gets its own questions to answer – although the other team members may answer the question if the first team doesn't know it. In the remaining games, both teams can answer the questions.

Original series (2005–2011)

Games begun in the original series included:

Know Your Product, in which each team captain chooses one of four given topics. There are three questions from the topic that either team can answer. The questions are usually ordered by points allocated and the number of answers needed (i.e., the first question is worth one point and requires one answer, the second question is worth two points and requires two answers, and the final question is worth three points and requires three answers). This game is played first in every episode. In special episodes the topic is the show's theme which has five questions of which the fourth and fifth questions have four and five answers respectively. The game is named after the song by The Saints.
Substitute, in which one member from each team sings three well-known tunes, substituting words from a text provided by Hills. This is usually a technical manual or some kind of text that is humorous given the context (texts used have included Datsun 180B Service Manual, 2004 Australian Government Tax Pack, A Guide to Yabbie Farming and Be Bold with Bananas). The other members of that team then guess the songs. This game is loosely based on One Song to the Tune of Another from the BBC Radio 4 panel game I'm Sorry I Haven't a Clue and Adam Hills's own minor hit with Working Class Anthem, in which he sang the lyrics of the Australian National Anthem to the tune of Jimmy Barnes's "Working Class Man". The game is named after the song by The Who.
Cover Versions in which one team member is chosen to draw pictures (in silence), in initial episodes representing album covers and in later episodes representing song titles. The other team members attempt to name the album/song. The drawings are not allowed to contain words or numbers. Music used during this game is Axel F.
Samplemania/Videomania, in which five or six songs/music video clips are edited into one 30-second clip. Players must identify the different songs/videos in the clip after they have all been played, and are not allowed to take notes.
Turning Japanese in which the lyrics of well-known song are translated into Japanese using an online web translator and then translated back into English using the same translator. Contestants must name the title of the original song. The game is named after the song by The Vapors
Please Please Tell Me Now Hills presents part of a music video clip, and the teams must answer questions about the video. The game is named after a line in Is There Something I Should Know? by Duran Duran
 Musician or Serial Killer, in which each team is shown a photograph of a person and is asked to say whether that person is a musician or a serial killer. Early episodes tasked individual panelists with identification, resulting in six rounds of this game.
 Sir Mix'n'Matchalot, in which each team has to match three famous people with three obscure facts about them. The game title is a play on rapper Sir Mix-a-Lot.
Bottom 100 in which Hills provides each team with a choice of two awful songs and asks the team members to say which was rated worse by a given group or list. The title of this game is a play on the Triple J Hottest 100.
You Can Buy Me Love (titled Can Buy Me Love in the 2021 reboot) in which Adam reads out three celebrity-themed items that have been found on eBay (e.g., a tour jacket, keychain with artist/band name). Some of these items are the usual merchandise, whereas others are down-right weird. The teams are then asked to place each item in order from cheapest to the most expensive. The game is named after the song Can't Buy Me Love by The Beatles.
Common People in which the teams identify the commonality between three musicians/musical personalities or songs/albums. The game is named after the song Love of the Common People by Paul Young.
Malvern Stars on 45 in which a single team member rides a bicycle which powers a record player. The rotation speed of each record is governed by the team member's pedalling speed. The pedaller must continue until the other team members name as many songs as possible in the time limit. The game is named after the bicycle manufacturer Malvern Star and the band Stars on 45. In the 2021 reboot, a mobile DJ manages the record player.
Mondegreens, in which teams are given a short piece of text that vaguely sounds like real lyrics or a set of lyrics. Teams must then identify the real lyrics.
Looking for Clues, in which teams have to name a band from a cryptic clue given by Hills. The game is named after the song by Robert Palmer.
Look What They've Done... (to my song, ma) (occasionally called Name That Tune) in which song clips have been changed and the players must identify the tracks. Most commonly, a guest artist or group is used to play the tracks in a different style from the original, however the songs have also been played backwards, which later became its own game (Step Back In Time), through headphones played to maximum volume, through ringtones, over the top of each other, or on a malfunctioning radio. The game is named after the song What Have They Done to My Song Ma by Melanie Safka.
Something's Missing, in which the teams are shown album covers with an item or word blanked out, and must identify the missing item. The game is named after the song Something's Missing (In My Life) by Paul Jabara and Donna Summer.
One out of Three Ain't Bad, in which teams are given a relatively obscure musical story and are presented with three possible endings. Teams must select the true ending to the story. The game is named after the song Two Out of Three Ain't Bad by Meat Loaf.
Word Up, in which teams must identify the lyrics of a song from five random words. The game is named after the song by Cameo.
You're The Voices, in which a member of each team must stand next to the opposite team and sing a song from a book (by singing only la la la). The first team to get its member's song correct wins a point. The game is named after the song by John Farnham.
All Shook Up, in which each team is shown a series of anagrams of musicians' names (e.g. "Bomb Early" – "Bob Marley"), and team members have to unscramble them. If nobody guesses an anagram immediately, Hills gives a clue. The game is named after the song by Elvis Presley.
Two Little Words, in which one member of each team is blind-folded by wearing "Spicks Specs" and the others are given the name of a musician or band. The blind-folded member must name the musician or band from one-word clues given by the other two team members. The game is named after the song Three Little Words by The Rhythm Boys. Music used during this game is Green Onions.
Counting the Beat, in which one member of each team plays songs on a keyboard while the others try to name the song. Keyboardists are given a list of numbers corresponding to the order in which they should play the notes, but are given no indication of the rhythm. The game was introduced in 2008 and is named after the song by The Swingers. In the 2021 reboot, the game is played on a giant keyboard played by feet.
I'll Jumble For Ya, in which one team member is given thirty seconds to correctly match nine song titles divided in half and mixed up on a magnetic board. The game is named after the song I'll Tumble 4 Ya by Culture Club.
Step Back in Time, in which songs are played backwards and must be identified by the teams. The game is named after the song by Kylie Minogue.
What's The Story?, in which a team receives three stories about an opposing team member. Team members must decide whether each story is either true, half true, or untrue. The game is named after the album (What's the Story) Morning Glory? by Oasis.
Turn Turn Turn, in which each team is presented with a sliding block puzzle of a famous album cover, and members have to work together to solve it. Both teams battle it out, and points are given to the team completing its puzzle first. The game is named after the song made famous by The Byrds.
Reelin' in the Years, in which each team is given 10 songs and 10 years, and have to match the songs to the years of first performance. The game is named after the song by Steely Dan.
F.A.C.T. In The U.S.A., in which team members are given musical facts based on towns they select on a map of the USA, and have to say whether the fact is true of false. The game is named after the song R.O.C.K. In The U.S.A. by John Cougar Mellencamp
Toss the Telly, in which a member from each team tries to throw TVs out of a hotel window. Points are scored based on how many TVs are successfully thrown.
Spickety Blanks, in which each team is presented with a quotation from a famous musician in which one of the words is blanked out; team members have give the missing word. This game is a satirical take on the show Blankety Blanks.
Disco v Punk, in which each team has to knock over punks (bowling pins) with a disco ball (bowling ball.) Points are scored based on how many punks a team is able to knock down.
Dancing Substitute, in which one member from each team is chosen to perform well-known dance moves for the other members to name. This is a variation of the game Substitute.
Apprentices Masters, in which teams have to guess album covers that are painted in the style of European masters.
Sixties Jumble, in which teams are given a set of songs and events, and have to match them to the year they happened/were released. 
Across the Ditch, Bro, in which each team is presented with a list of songs from either Australia or New Zealand, and has to match the songs to their country of origin.
Mistletoss, in which teams deliver Christmas presents by throwing them into a goal within a given time limit. Points are scored based on how many presents a team successfully delivers. Different variations of this game exist, such as the teams throwing fruit at singers who are keeping baby Jesus awake at the inn, throwing CDs into the chimney of a model house, and throwing presents into windows of a rehab clinic or into pairs of stockings.
Who? Who? Who?, in which teams have to identify a music-industry personality dressed in a Christmas outfit.
The Final Countdown, in which players beat the buzzer to answer generic musical quiz question. This is the only game in which points are deducted for incorrect responses. The game is the final game of each program and is named after the song by Europe.

Many of these games have proven more popular than others. Substitute was used consistently throughout the early history of the show, appearing in almost every episode (although later was occasionally excluded in favour of Cover Versions). Other games were used only every now and then and others were used even less frequently. Some other games which proved to be popular early in the show's history have been used less or even abandoned later including Musician or Serial Killer and Bottom 100. Both were commonly used early in 2005, but rarely later. Some games were also introduced later in the series, and occasionally a game will be temporarily changed in some way (e.g. Musician Or Serial Killer was changed once to ARIA winner or Audience Member on the ARIA special episode), or only ever used in one episode (e.g. Disco v Punk.)

Games introduced in the 2021 series
Cover Cover Cover Cover Chameleon, in which each team is presented with a person dressed up like someone from a famous album cover, who then reveals a recreation of it using real life objects and a soundstage. The team must identify what album the person is trying to recreate. The game is named after Karma Chameleon by Culture Club.
Art For Art's Sake, in which the teams are presented with crudely-drawn fan art of famous musicians and must identify the musicians. The game is named after a song by 10cc.
Am I Ever Gonna See Your Face Again?, where each team is presented with a mysterious musician through a Skype call (with the musician's face and voice replaced), whose identity is revealed after ten "yes or no" questions are asked. The game is named after a song by The Angels. The game itself is based on "Who am I?" games.
Never Tell Us Apart, in which the teams are presented with clips of two songs with rhyming names (e.g., "Fast Car" / "All Star") played at the same time, and teams must identify each song. The game is named after Never Tear Us Apart by INXS.
Papa's Left His Brand New Bag, in which each team is presented with an item of baggage left at the airport by famous musicians, and must guess the musician by looking through its contents. Every member is given some unique item, resulting in six rounds of the game. The game is named after Papa's Got a Brand New Bag by James Brown.
On My List, in which each team is presented a question with multiple possible answers, and the team must write the correct answer.
Picture This, in which each team is provided a set of "cryptic" images that refer to a song title, and must identify the song title from the images.
Tuberstylin', in which each team must guess a song based on YouTube comments left on its music video. If a team member does not guess it within a single comment, another comment providing a clearer hint is given. The game is named after Superstylin' by Groove Armada.
Fa-Fa-Fa-Fa-Fashion, in which each team is presented with five images of a famous musician from different career stages and must sort them from oldest to newest. A song by the artist will play in the background while they sort. The game is named after Fashion by David Bowie.
Adam and The Antonyms, in which each team must give a song's title from its opposite (e.g., "Wintertime Happiness" / "Summertime Sadness"). The game's name is a play on the name of the English rock band Adam and the Ants.
Listomania, in which each team is presented with a list of an artist's top five favourite songs, and must give the correct order using a magnetic board. Then a pre-recorded video of the artist explaining the correct order is played. The game's name is a pun on the fan frenzy known as Lisztomania.

Games introduced in the 2022 series 

 Secret Song: in which clues to a song are hidden throughout each episode, and teams must identify the song, which is asked as the final question in The Final Countdown. Teams that are correct are awarded five points.
 Stand & Delivery, in which each team must identify a musician from that person's home deliveries. Similar to Papa's Left His Brand New Bag, but teams are given only a single container. The game is named after Stand and Deliver by Adam and the Ants.
In Da Club, in which all team members must stand in a faux nightclub queue and ask the manager clues about what act is performing. The game is named after the song by 50 Cent.
 The Kids Are Alright, in which teams are shown clips of kids describing music videos, and have to guess which song they are talking about. The game is named after the song by The Who.
 Another Brick in the Wall, in which teams have to guess iconic outfits worn by various musicians. Each outfit is modeled behind a giant wall, with pieces able to be taken out to reveal a part of the outfit. Points decrease as bricks are removed. The game is named after the song by Pink Floyd.

Production
Spicks and Specks was first filmed in Gordon Street, Elsternwick, at Studio 31, before being moved to ABC Melbourne's new studios in Southbank.

Episodes

Series 1 (2005)

Series 2 (2006)

Series 3 (2007)

Series 4 (2008)

Series 5 (2009)

Series 6 (2010)

Series 7 (2011)

Series 8 (2014)

Specials (2018-2020)

Series 9 (2021)

Series 10 (2022)

Specials

A Very Specky Christmas
Since 2005, an annual hour-long Christmas episode, entitled "A Very Specky Christmas"  on the Sunday night before Christmas. All questions are either about Christmas songs, or music from the previous year. While these episodes remain true to the standard format with three members on each team, adaptions are made to allow more guest stars to appear. Additional or notably different games have included:
 Mistletoss, a physical challenge in which the teams are required to throw Christmas presents into a goal in a given time limit. In 2005, the teams threw CDs into the chimney of a model house; in 2006, wrapped gifts were thrown into celebrities' Christmas stockings of different sizes; in 2007, wrapped gifts were thrown through the windows of a "rehab clinic" with a guard out the front, Frank Woodley.
 Sir Mix'n'Matchalot is adapted so that three additional celebrities appear and are arbitrarily given Christmas presents by the show. The panel then asks questions and attempts to allocate the presents.
 Substitute is adapted so that trained choirs sing the tunes of Christmas songs with the words from famous quotes and works from the past year, such as controversial pieces of legislation, political speeches, or pop culture.

Best Of
As the last episode of each year, Spicks and Specks reflects back on all the highlights, lowlights and memorable guests throughout the year.

100th episode
On 30 May 2007, Spicks and Specks celebrated its 100th episode. Instead of the show being divided into games, teams were asked 100 questions – one from each of the previous 99 episodes, and one new question, "What is the last question on our 100th episode?" which was correctly answered by Antoinette Halloran. Alan Brough's team was victorious although it did come down to the very last question.

Behind the scenes
This was the first episode of Spicks and Specks in which the games are not played at all. Instead, this behind-the-scenes special hosted by regular contestant Hamish Blake took a tour through the studios and dressing rooms of the ABC studios in Elsternwick and conducted interviews with show personnel.

Production studio
The show was filmed at ABC Studios in Elsternwick, Victoria, which are rented by ABV-2

With ABC Studios in Ripponlea getting ready to shut down, the program's new home is now at ABC Melbourne studios in Southbank, Victoria. With the move from Ripponlea also comes a move from ABC as the broadcast provider. It is recorded in front of a live audience of 500 people.

200th episode
On 9 September 2009, Spicks and Specks celebrated its 200th episode. The show had a number of members from the Melbourne Symphony Orchestra behind the hosts, who performed the show's many musical questions including the theme song Spicks and Specks by the Bee Gees. The episode also included returning guests Ella Hooper, Hamish Blake, Paul Grabowsky and Meshel Laurie. The questions covered 200 years of music from 1809 to 2009.

Final episode of original series
A one-hour special, called "The Finale", was the final episode of the original series of Spicks and Specks and went to air on 23 November 2011. There was a change to the list of guests: various guests rotated during different rounds of the show. All of the credited guest appearances on the show were Ella Hooper, Geoffrey Rush, Scott Edgar, Dave O'Neil, Rhonda Burchmore, Adam Richard, Darren Hayes, Brian Cadd, Brian Mannix, Felicity Ward, Amanda Keller, Jimeoin, Tommy Dean, Shane Bourne, Dan Sultan, Richard Gill, Antoinette Halloran, Denise Scott, Peter Helliar, Barry Morgan, Megan Washington, Damian Callinan, Hamish Blake and Andy Lee (who were in New York at the time of filming for their Hamish and Andy's Gap Year).

Other specials
Special episodes have been compiled for various seasonal or arbitrary themes, including:
Halloween (dubbed Spicks and Spooks)
ARIA Hall of Fame inductees
Children's music
Music from films (dubbed Spicks and Flicks)
Mother's Day 
Australia vs New Zealand
50s
60s
70s
80s
Countdown Special 
Britannia Special
Australiana Special
Americana Special
Europa Special
Comedy Special
AusMusic Special
1990s Special
2000s Special
2010s Special
In each case, questions are written, and some games are changed slightly or new games invented, to suit the theme.

2018 one-off reunion 
On 27 August 2018, it was announced that the show would return for a one-off hour-long special as part of the ABC's "Ausmusic" month. Confirmed as panellists were award-winning rapper Adam Briggs, singer/songwriter Ricki-Lee Coulter and comedians Frank Woodley and Denise Scott, plus a line-up of famous guests to lend their musical talents and knowledge.

The one-hour special aired on 4 November, with a repeat airing on ABC Comedy on 10 November. Guests included Adalita, Vika and Linda Bull, Troy Cassar-Daley, Kate Ceberano, Murray Cook, Paul Dempsey, Antoinette Halloran, Guido Hatzis, Kram, Angie Hart, Kate Miller-Heidke, Lindsay McDougall, Luke McGregor, Russell Morris, Montaigne, Pseudo Echo, Josh Pyke, Ruel, Eskimo Joe's Kav Temperley, Tripod, Cal Wilson, Ross Wilson. The show was dedicated to long time regular guest Richard Gill, who had died a week before the special went to air. It ranked #1 nationally with 1.36 million viewers.

2019–2020 specials
In August 2019, it was announced that the show with the original lineup would return for a one-off special in November 2019, followed by a short three-episode reboot airing in 2020. The episodes featured original host Adam Hills and team captains Alan Brough and Myf Warhurst, with each episode focusing on a specific generation of music.

Four specials were broadcast; the Ausmusic special, the 90s special, the 2000s special and the 2010s special. Because music from the 2010s was not included in the original Spicks and Specks show, Adam Hills said it was his favourite to film.

DVD releases
 In 2007, the first Spicks and Specks product was launched, the Spicks and Specks Interactive Quiz DVD.
 A Very Specky Christmas was released on 4 December 2008; it contains the 2007 and 2006 Christmas Specials.
 In 2009, the DVD Up to our Eras was released. It contained the 50s special, the 60s special, the 70s special and the 80s special.
 Spicks and Specks: The Remixes was released on 5 August 2010 containing 4 episodes that were uncut and uncensored.
 Spicks & Specks: World Tour was released on 4 November 2010, containing the Australiana, Britannia, Americana and Europa specials, and is said to have unseen footage.
 Spick & Specks: The Finale was released on 1 December 2011, containing the final episode and The Best of Spicks & Specks.
 Spicks & Specks: The Pick of Spicks  was released on 5 April 2012, containing extended versions of four classic episodes chosen by the hosts.
 The Spicks and Specks Boxset was released on 1 April 2015, the 4-DVD set contains: The Remixes, World Tour, The Finale and the Pick of Spicks.

Awards

Related games
In 2008, the Spicks and Specks Board Game was released by Imagination Games. It was followed by "Up To Our Eras" in 2010, and an "Ausmusic Edition" in 2019.

In 2011 Spicks and Specks Quiz, an app for iPhones, was released. Users are given two play options, Quick Play or Quiz Challenge, with various games taken from the show. There are a number of top-up Quiz Packs to extend the game. On its initial release, the name of the app was automatically censored by Apple to 'S****s and Specks' because of the derogatory use of the word 'spick' in the US to describe a person of Hispanic heritage.

References

External links
 
 

Australian Broadcasting Corporation original programming
2000s Australian game shows
2010s Australian game shows
2020s Australian game shows
Australian comedy television series
Australian music television series
2005 Australian television series debuts
2011 Australian television series endings
2018 Australian television series debuts
Television shows set in Melbourne
Musical game shows
Australian panel games
English-language television shows
Australian television series revived after cancellation
Television game shows with incorrect disambiguation